Society is a monthly English-language lifestyle and celebrity magazine published in India. It was founded in 1971 by Nari Hira, and is published by Magna Publishing Co. Ltd. in Mumbai. As of 2018, it is edited by Sapna Sarfare.

Society describes itself as "India's leading people and lifestyle magazine," which "has always been the front runner in reporting about the lives of the rich and famous," and covering "the latest news, controversy or achievements of people in the area of business, politics, art, sports, media or spicy details on socialites."

In Pop Culture India!, author Asha Kasbekar describes Society as part of a new wave of 1970s lifestyle magazines, along with Debonair, Gentleman, Inside Outside, Interior, Savvy, and Women's Era.

The magazine also conducts awards to honour achievers in various fields including Society Achievers Award, Society Global Indian Icon Award and Society Pride of India Honour.

References

External links
 Official website

Celebrity magazines
English-language magazines published in India
Lifestyle magazines
Magazines established in 1971
Mass media in Mumbai
Monthly magazines published in India